Tatsuo Arai is a Japanese engineer from  the Osaka University, Osaka, Japan was named a Fellow of the Institute of Electrical and Electronics Engineers (IEEE) in 2016 for contributions to micro manipulators and sensors, and applications to cellular biology.

References 

Fellow Members of the IEEE
Living people
Academic staff of Osaka University
Japanese electrical engineers
Year of birth missing (living people)